Angelo Prisco (August 1, 1939 – June 21, 2017) also known as "The Horn", was an American mobster in New Jersey who became a caporegime in the Genovese crime family.

Prisco was a relative of Genovese crime family soldier Rudolph "Rudy" Prisco who was identified along with hundreds as members of the crime family by Joe Valachi and convicted of crimes. Prisco was a member of the Purple Gang during the 1970s. He was later invited to join the Genovese family after the Purple Gang disbanded and later become a made man. With the 1988 murder of Genovese caporegime John DiGilio, Prisco assumed control of the Genovese family operations in New Jersey.  a Genovese crime family who was indicted and convicted of criminal activity from the testimony of Joseph Valachi in 1963.

In 1992, Prisco ordered the murder of Genovese family associate Angelo Sanguiolo. After discovering that Sanguiolo had robbed four Genovese gambling operations in the Bronx, Prisco received permission from Genovese boss Vincent Gigante to kill Sanguiolo. In 1994, Prisco was charged with the 1988 DiGilio murder as part of a racketeering indictment. However, in 1998, Prisco was allowed to plead guilty to the arson only and was sentenced to 12 years in New Jersey state prison.

In 2002, Prisco applied to the New Jersey State Parole Board for early release, but was denied. However, in May of that year the parole board reversed their decision and in August Prisco was released from prison.

In 2003, a parole board member complained to the State Attorney General's office that the parole board chairman told him an aide to Governor James McGreevey had requested Prisco's release. The governor and his aide immediately denied the allegations. After an investigation by the Attorney General, no criminal charges were filed. However, $485,000 was paid as a result of a whistleblower suit based on retaliatory actions against the whistleblower.

In 2006, Prisco was charged with extorting an electrician to not bid for a job so that a mob-related electrical company could win the business.

In December 2008, Prisco was indicted in New York for the 1992 Sanguiolo murder, along with extorting a Manhattan-based construction business, dealing in stolen property, and illegal gambling. On August 18, 2009, Prisco was sentenced to life in prison for the Sanguiolo murder.

Relatives include 
Michael prisco 
Angelique prisco Prisco died serving a life sentence at the United States Penitentiary, Coleman in Central Florida on June 21, 2017.

References

External links
New York Times: Metro Briefing
New York Times: Briefings: Law; Parole Questioned By John Sullivan
McGreevey Denies Report That Aide Influenced Parole Board By Laura Mansnerus
AP.Com The Soprano State: Angelo Prisco indicted for murder by Bob Ingle
Bureau of Prisons inmate locator
Michael Prisco Saratoga

1939 births
Genovese crime family
American gangsters of Italian descent
2017 deaths
Gangsters sentenced to life imprisonment
American people who died in prison custody
Prisoners who died in United States federal government detention
American people convicted of murder
People convicted of murder by the United States federal government